Carl Andreas Prytz (born 7 December 1972) is a Swedish curler and curling coach.

He is a 2012 Swedish men's champion, a 2009 Swedish mixed doubles champion and a 2003 Swedish mixed champion.

In 2015 he was inducted into the Swedish Curling Hall of Fame.

Teams

Men's

Mixed

Mixed doubles

Record as a coach of national teams

References

External links

Living people
1972 births
Swedish male curlers
Swedish curling champions
Swedish curling coaches